Descent is a 2017 Nigerian film produced by Nwankwo Chibuzor. Descent addresses issues relating to family, narcotics, love and karma. Descent has won a Recognition Award for Best Picture International Trailer and at the year won the Special Movie Award (SMA) in the Republic of The Gambia.

Synopsis 
Descent tells a story of two underworld kings whose greed and thirst for power and vengeance brought them to hurting each other's family. Descent is a combination of drama and action as the suspense and emotions can put viewers on the edge and in tears. The movie highlights true African story of family, betrayal, trust, greed and power.

Cast 
Some of the major characters in the movie include;
 Zack Orji as Kalu Achebe 
 Matt Stern as Andrew Morgan 
 Palesa Madisakwane 
 JT Medupe 
 Tayo Faniran 
 Benedikt Sebastian

References 

English-language Nigerian films
2010s English-language films